A ribosomal protein L21 leader is a ribosomal protein leader autoregulatory structure that regulates mRNAs containing a gene that encodes ribosomal protein L21.
An RNA motif was predicted to function as an L21 leader in a bioinformatics study, and is
found in B. subtilis and other low-GC Gram-positive bacteria within the phylum Bacillota. It is located in the 5′ untranslated regions of mRNAs encoding ribosomal protein L21, a protein of unknown function, and ribosomal protein L27 (rplU-ysxB-rpmA).

See also
Ribosomal protein leader

References

External links 
 

Ribosomal protein leader